Pangasius kinabatanganensis is a species of shark catfish. It is found in the Kinabatangan basin, in northeastern Borneo which is in the state of Sabah, Malaysia.

References

Further reading

External links

Pangasiidae
Catfish of Asia
Fish described in 1991
Taxa named by Chavalit Vidthayanon
Taxa named by Tyson R. Roberts